The Helsinki village landing was fought during the Finnish War between Sweden and Russia on 26–28 September 1808 (J:14-16 S), a part of the battles of the Turku archipelago. King Gustav IV Adolf of Sweden planned a large landing operation, over 8,000 strong. Due to the difficult sea weather conditions, the task force under Colonel Anders Fredrik Skjöldebrad was forced to return to Sweden, damaged and broken. The other task force of 3,300 men under Lieutenant Colonel Gustav Olof Lagerbring landed at Helsinki village (Taivassalo) successfully and the troops advanced to the inland areas. The king of Sweden was late to the battle area himself; he arrived on 28 September 1808 in his own yacht.

Course of battle

Monday 26 September (J:14 S)
The landing started in at 09:00 o’clock in the morning. The Cossacks who patrolled at the beach were pushed back to the village of Järvenperä. The Swedish troops advanced slowly and the Russians reacted quickly, as they sent 3 companies from the Pernov (Pärnu) Musketeer Regiment supported by 2 cannons to oppose the advancing Swedes at Järvenperä. The Kronoberg Regiment offensive caused the Russians to retreat. The Swedes had 4 men wounded on the first day of fighting.

Tuesday 27 September (J:15)
In the morning, the Swedes proceeded to advance in the direction of the village of Viiainen. There, Russian Lieutenant General Karl Gustav von Baggovut had built a defense line with a battalion of the Nevski Musketeer Regiment. According to Baggovut's orders, they had to delay the progress of the Swedes, but the Swedes pushed the Russians back from their positions.  Colonel Freiherr Gustaf Reinhold Boije af Gennäs was named as the commander of the Swedish battle forces. The Swedes had 12 killed, 71 wounded and 3 missing on the second day of fighting.

Wednesday 28 September (J:16)
During the night, Prince Pyotr Bagration brought sizable reinforcements to Baggovut.  Boije planned a two-pronged offensive for the Swedes. One force would attack from north of Viiainen to Puosta, while at the same time the Lagerbring force would strike the flank of Russian forces at Puosta through Haaroinen and Ranta.  Because of the reinforcements, Baggovut had the initiative and he struck strongly and directly to Boije's main line of position while simultaneously starting a flank offensive via Ranta.  Lagerbring's attack was stopped by the force of the Russian troops and he had to retreat.  Boije found the situation hopeless and ordered a general retreat to the Helsinki village. At the beach the situation was chaotic. The king had ordered all the gunboats to Kahiluoto, and so there were only defenseless troopships left. The loading of the ships happened in disarray under Russian fire and resulted in large losses; The Swedes had sustained 45 killed, 176 wounded and 346 missing (of which more than 300 captured) on the third day of fighting, while the Russians had 529 losses in total during the three days.

Swedish regiments and losses
Swedish command Staff; 1 wounded and 1 missing — 2
Svea Life Guards (1 battalion); 9 killed, 20 wounded and 3 missing — 32
Swedish Guard Regiment (1 battalion); 6 killed, 27 wounded and 3 missing — 36
Finnish Guard Regiment (1 battalion); 13 killed, 25 wounded and 38 missing — 76
Jägers (1 battalion, emerged from other regiments); 11 killed, 42 wounded and 4 missing — 57
Kronoberg Infantry Regiment and auxiliary reserve (3 battalions; of which 1 reserve); 11 killed, 72 wounded and 145 missing — 228
Västmanland auxiliary reserve (1 battalion); 2 killed, 48 wounded and 64 missing — 114
Uppland auxiliary reserve (1 battalion); 4 killed, 7 wounded and 87 missing — 98
Life Guards of Horse (2 squadrons); 3 missing
Svea Artillery Regiment; 1 killed, 5 wounded and 1 missing — 7
An additional 4 men were wounded from the Kronoberg and, or Svea Life Guard regiments. — 4

In total: less than 3,800 men (no more than 3,300 in the main battle on the 28th); 57 killed, 251 wounded and 349 missing (of which about 300 privates and 11 officers captured according to Russian records).

Notes, citations and sources

Notes

Citations

Sources

External links
 Four Actions in Finland during the Russian-Swedish War of 1808-09
Russian Army uniforms during the Napoleonic Wars

 Helsinki village landing
Conflicts in 1808
Battles involving Sweden
Battles involving Russia
History of Southwest Finland
1808 in Finland
September 1808 events